Katzman is a surname. Notable people with the surname include:

 Abe Katzman, American violinist and klezmer recording artist 
 Henry Katzman, American composer and musician
 John Katzman, education entrepreneur
 Julie Katzman, American financier
 Leonard Katzman, American film and television screenwriter, producer and director
 Mark Katzman, American writer
 Sam Katzman, American film producer
 Terry Katzman (1955-2019), American producer, sound engineer, archivist, and record-store owner 
 Theo Katzman, American singer-songwriter

See also 
 Katzmann
 Katz (name)

Surnames from nicknames